Elias  code or Elias gamma code is a universal code encoding positive integers developed by Peter Elias. It is used most commonly when coding integers whose upper-bound cannot be determined beforehand.

Encoding

To code a number x ≥ 1:
 Let  be the highest power of 2 it contains, so 2N ≤ x < 2N+1.
 Write out  zero bits, then

An equivalent way to express the same process:
 Encode  in unary; that is, as  zeroes followed by a one.

To represent a number , Elias gamma (γ) uses  bits.

The code begins (the implied probability distribution for the code is added for clarity):

Decoding
To decode an Elias gamma-coded integer:
Read and count 0s from the stream until you reach the first 1. Call this count of zeroes N.
Considering the one that was reached to be the first digit of the integer, with a value of 2N, read the remaining N digits of the integer.

Uses
Gamma coding is used in applications where the largest encoded value is not known ahead of time, or to compress data in which small values are much more frequent than large values.

Gamma coding is a building block in the Elias delta code.

Generalizations 

Gamma coding does not code zero or negative integers.
One way of handling zero is to add 1 before coding and then subtract 1 after decoding.
Another way is to prefix each nonzero code with a 1 and then code zero as a single 0.

One way to code all integers is to set up a bijection, mapping integers (0, −1, 1, −2, 2, −3, 3, ...) to (1, 2, 3, 4, 5, 6, 7, ...) before coding.  In software, this is most easily done by mapping non-negative inputs to odd outputs, and negative inputs to even outputs, so the least-significant bit becomes an inverted sign bit:

Exponential-Golomb coding generalizes the gamma code to integers with a "flatter" power-law distribution, just as Golomb coding generalizes the unary code.
It involves dividing the number by a positive divisor, commonly a power of 2, writing the gamma code for one more than the quotient, and writing out the remainder in an ordinary binary code.

See also
 Elias delta (δ) coding
 Elias omega (ω) coding
 Posit (number format)

References

Further reading
 

Numeral systems
Lossless compression algorithms
Articles with example C code